Prakash Karat (born 7 February 1948) is an Indian Communist politician. He was the General Secretary of the Communist Party of India (Marxist) from 2005 to 2015.

Education and early career
Prakash Karat was born in Letpadan, Burma on 7 February 1948. His father worked as a clerk in the Burma Railways, where he had sought employment during the British Raj. Prakash Karat's family hailed from Elappully, Palakkad, Kerala. Prakash Karat lived in Palakkad till the age of five before returning to Burma where he lived with his family till the age of nine, when his family left Burma for good in 1957.

Karat studied in the Madras Christian College Higher Secondary School in Chennai. On finishing school, he won the first prize in an all-India essay competition on the Tokyo Olympics. He was sent on a ten-day visit to the Tokyo Olympics in 1964 as a result. He went to the Madras Christian College as an undergraduate student in economics, winning the prize for best all round student on graduation. Encouraged by the Scottish theologian Duncan B. Forrester, one of his college professors, he got a scholarship to Britain's University of Edinburgh, for a master's degree in politics. In 1970 he received an MSc degree from the University of Edinburgh for the thesis "Language and politics in modern India". At Edinburgh he became active in student politics and met Professor Victor Kiernan, the well-known Marxist historian. His political activism began with anti-apartheid protests at the university, for which he was rusticated. The rustication was suspended on good behaviour.

Karat returned to India in 1970 and joined Jawaharlal Nehru University, New Delhi. He worked as an aide to A.K. Gopalan, the legendary communist leader from Kerala and leader of the CPI(M) group in Parliament from 1971 to 1973, while doing his Ph.D. in JNU. Karat was one of the founders of the Students Federation of India (SFI), in Jawaharlal Nehru University. He was involved with student politics and was elected the third president of the Jawaharlal Nehru University Students' Union. He also became the second President of the Students Federation of India between 1974 to 1979. During this period his associates included N. Ram, later editor of The Hindu daily, the radical women's activist Mythili Sivaraman and, less closely, P. Chidambaram, who later became India's finance minister. He worked underground for one and a half years during the Emergency in India in 1975-76. He was arrested twice and spent eight days in prison.

Personal life 
He is married to activist-politician Brinda Karat.

Communist Party of India (Marxist)
After returning to India in 1970, Karat joined the Jawaharlal Nehru University and thereafter Communist Party of India (Marxist). He began working as an aide to the party leader A. K. Gopalan. He was the Secretary of the Delhi State Committee of the CPI(M) from 1982 to 1985. Prakash Karat was elected to the Central Committee of the CPI (M) in 1985 and became a member of the ‘Politburo’ in 1992. He took over as the General Secretary of the Communist Party of India (Marxist) in 2005 at the 18th Congress of the Party held in Delhi. During his era Communist Part of India (Marxist) see a sharp downfall due to his rigid behaviour on party line. He was succeeded by Sitaram Yechury in 2015 at the 21st Party Congress held in Visakhapatnam

Party Leader
Karat was elected to the Central Committee of the CPI (M) in 1985 and became a member of the PolitBureau in 1992. The Politburo is the key decision making wing of the party. In 2005, he was elected General Secretary.

Lok Sabha Election Results during tenure of Karat as General Secretary

Academic and political writings
Since 1992,  Karat has been on the editorial board of CPI(M)'s academic journal, The Marxist. He is also the managing director of Naya Rasta Publishers, the parent company of Leftword Books. He is the author of five books.
 Language, Nationality and Politics in India (1972)
 A World to Win—Essays on the Communist Manifesto (1999), edited
 Across Time and Continents: A tribute to Victor Kiernan (2003), edited
 Subordinate Ally: The nuclear deal and India-US strategic relations (2008)
 Politics and policies(2008)

References

Living people
1948 births
Madras Christian College alumni
Alumni of the University of Edinburgh
Communist Party of India (Marxist) politicians from Kerala
Indian atheists
Indian political writers
Jawaharlal Nehru University alumni
Indian Marxist writers
Anti-Americanism 
Indian communists 
Indian anti-capitalists 
Anti-capitalists   
Anti-imperialism 
Leaders of political parties in India
Malayali people
General Secretaries of the Communist Party of India (Marxist)
20th-century Indian non-fiction writers
Indian male writers
People from Palakkad district
People involved in the Citizenship Amendment Act protests
Students' Federation of India All India Presidents
Marxist writers 
Marxist theorists 
Marxist humanists
Students' unions
Jawaharlal Nehru University Students' Union